"David Watts" is a song written by Ray Davies that originally appeared on the Kinks' 1967 album Something Else by the Kinks. It was also the American and Continental Europe B-side to "Autumn Almanac". It has been included on several compilation albums, including The Kink Kronikles (1972) and a live version recorded at Landmark Theatre in Syracuse, New York, 4 March 1980 was included on One for the Road (The Kinks album), a double live album released June 1980.

Background
The song is about the singer's great admiration of fellow schoolboy David Watts, who appears to have a "charmed life". There is an undercurrent of either deep envy or, as AllMusic put it, "a schoolboy crush". It is also, as Jon Savage has written, one of Ray Davies' "sharpest homoerotic songs". As Ray Davies confirmed in The Kinks: The Official Biography by Savage, "David Watts is a real person. He was a concert promoter in Rutland." He goes on to relate how the real Watts was gay and demonstrated an obvious romantic interest in his brother Dave Davies. In this light, lines such as "he is so gay and fancy free" and "all the girls in the neighbourhood try to go out with David Watts... but can't succeed" provide a second level of interpretation based on this ironic in-joke. The band members were invited back to Watts' home for a drink one night after a concert. Ray Davies recalled to Q magazine in a 2016 interview: "My brother, Dave, was in a flamboyant mood and I could see that David Watts had a crush on him. So I tried to persuade Dave to marry David Watts because he was connected with Rutland brewery. See, that's how stupid my brain was." (Chuckles silently) "I thought: if I can get Dave fixed up with this Watts guy, I'll be set up for life and get all the ale I want. But the song's really about complete envy. It was based on someone else entirely – the head boy at my school. He was captain of the team, all those things, but I can't tell you his real name as I only spoke to him a few months ago."

The Jam version

The song was later covered by the Jam, who released it on 18 August 1978 as a single, then included it on their third studio album, All Mod Cons (with different mixes used for the single and album versions). This version, which reached No. 25 in the UK Singles Chart, featured bassist Bruce Foxton on lead vocals rather than Paul Weller, as it was not in the right key for the Jam frontman. The track was released as a double A-side along with "'A' Bomb in Wardour Street", of which a distinct, slightly shorter version was used for the single release and which would also appear later that year on All Mod Cons.

Personnel
According to band researcher Doug Hinman:

The Kinks
Ray Davies lead vocal, acoustic guitar
Dave Davies backing vocal, electric guitar
Pete Quaife backing vocal, bass
Mick Avory drums

Additional musician
Nicky Hopkins piano

References

Sources

 

1967 songs
LGBT-related songs
The Kinks songs
1978 singles
The Jam songs
Songs about fictional male characters
Songs written by Ray Davies
Song recordings produced by Ray Davies
Song recordings produced by Shel Talmy
Pye Records singles
1978 songs
Song recordings produced by Vic Coppersmith-Heaven
Polydor Records singles